Manitoba Provincial Road 352 is a provincial road in the southwestern section of the Canadian province of Manitoba.

Route description
PR 352 begins at PTH 5 near Birnie, and terminates at the PTH 34 near Arizona. Although the route is marked north–south, PR 352 travels in a northwest–southeast direction for most of its length.

After passing PR 265, the road continues in its southeasterly direction for another  through the community of Arden before meeting PTH 16 south of the community. After a very short concurrence west, PR 352 continues southeast from PTH 16, traveling  to meet PTH 1 at Sidney. Along the way, the road passes through the unincorporated communities of Edrans and Firdale. PR 352 turns south about  past Edrans and maintains this direction to PTH 1, with a very short eastern jaunt as it passes Firdale. Upon leaving Sidney, PR 352 continues south for  before turning east, continuing for  through Arizona to its southbound terminus.

The route is gravel for most its length, with a paved section between its northern terminus and Birnie along the section between PTH 16 and Arden.

References 

352